Nan'ao Subdistrict  is a township-level division situated in Shenzhen, Guangdong, China. It is located on Dapeng Peninsula, on the shores of Mirs Bay.

Education
There is one secondary school ("middle school"), Nan'ao Middle School (南澳中学), and one primary school, Nan'ao Central Primary School (南澳中心小学).

See also
 Qiniangshan
 Xichong, Shenzhen
 Ping Chau, an island of Hong Kong close to Nan'ao
 List of township-level divisions of Guangdong

References

Nanao
Subdistricts of Shenzhen